The Mexico women's national under-23 volleyball team represents Mexico in women's under-23 volleyball events. It is controlled and managed by the Mexican Volleyball Federation, a member of the North American volleyball body North, Central America and Caribbean Volleyball Confederation (NORCECA) and the international volleyball body the Fédération Internationale de Volleyball (FIVB).

Results

FIVB U23 World Championship
 Champions   Runners up   Third place   Fourth place

U23 Pan American Cup
 Champions   Runners up   Third place   Fourth place

Team

Current squad
The following list of players represented Mexico in the 2018 Women's U23 Pan-American Volleyball Cup:

Notable players

References

External links
Official website
FIVB profile

National women's under-23 volleyball teams
Volleyball in Mexico
Volleyball